London Buses route 137 is a Transport for London contracted bus route in London, England. Running between Streatham Hill and Marble Arch, it is operated by Arriva London.

History

In the 1930s, STL buses were used on this route which ran from Highgate to Elmers End.

The AEC Routemaster buses which operated route 137 since 1 November 1964 were replaced by one-person operated Wright Pulsar Gemini bodied DAF DB250s on 10 July 2004, ending a remarkable forty years of service

New Routemasters were introduced on 6 December 2014. The rear platform remains closed at all times except for when the bus is at bus stops.

On 15 July 2017 route 137 was permanently curtailed to Marble Arch and no longer serves Oxford Street.

Current route
Route 137 operates via these primary locations:
Streatham Hill Telford Avenue
Clapham Park Atkins Road
Clapham Common station 
Clapham Cedars Road
Queenstown Road station 
Battersea Park station 
Battersea Park
Chelsea Bridge
Belgravia Lister Hospital
Royal Hospital Chelsea
Chelsea Royal Hospital Road
Sloane Square station 
Knightsbridge station 
Hyde Park Corner station 
Mayfair Dorchester Hotel
Marble Arch Park Lane

References

External links

Bus routes in London
Transport in the Royal Borough of Kensington and Chelsea
Transport in the London Borough of Lambeth
Transport in the City of Westminster
Transport in the London Borough of Wandsworth